White Wolves: A Cry in the Wild II is a 1993 American adventure film directed and written by Catherine Cyran and starring Mark-Paul Gosselaar, Amy O'Neill, Ami Dolenz, David Moscow, Matt McCoy, Marc Riffon, and Eric Drachman. This film was shot in Oregon's Deschutes National Forest. It is the sequel to the 1990 film A Cry in the Wild.

Plot
Five teenagers and a teacher go on a two-week trek through the Cascade Mountains.  At first, they had a great time; making new friends and enjoying the wild. They then go to Eagle Rock where Mr. B (Matt McCoy) tells about his life in the woods, referring to the events of the first film. When they are on top of Eagle Rock, Mr. B falls in the woods, so the teenagers set off on a journey to find him. When they find him, they help him recover from the fall. It ends with the teenagers finding rescue helicopters and returning home safely. Only two of them had really seen the white wolf but never told Mr. B.

Cast
 Mark-Paul Gosselaar - Scott James
 Amy O'Neill - Pandra Sampson
 Ami Dolenz - Cara Jones
 David Moscow - Adam
 Matt McCoy - Jake (Mr. B)
 Marc Riffon - Benny
 Eric Drachman - Paramedic

Reception
Review aggregator Rotten Tomatoes gives the film a rating of 0%, based on 0 reviews. Audiences give the film a 74% rating, based on 436 reviews, with an average rating of 3.9/5.

References

External links

1993 films
1990s adventure films
Films about wolves
Films produced by Julie Corman
Films scored by Terry Plumeri
American sequel films
Films shot in Oregon
1990s English-language films
Films directed by Catherine Cyran